In heraldry, an augmentation (often termed augmentation of honour or sometimes augmentation of arms) is a modification or addition to a coat of arms, typically given by a monarch as either a mere mark of favour, or a reward or recognition for some meritorious act.  The grants of entire new coats by monarchs as a reward are not augmentations, but rather grants of arms, and (in theory) an augmentation mistakenly given to someone who did not have a right to a coat would be nugatory.

Augmentations could be of any kind: an ordinary, a charge, or a partition of the field. Most often it involves a chief  or a canton, which contains a part or the entirety of the arms of the sovereign, which he concedes to a loyal vassal. 

Not all modifications to a coat of arms are augmentations of honour. Brisures, for example, are for the cadet lines of the dynasty, which are made by adding a label, bend, bordure, etc.

A common case of augmentations of honour are French cities having in their arms a chief Azure, three fleurs de lys or, also known as the "chief of France", given to cities "faithful" to the king. . Grand Priors of the Order of Saint John of Jerusalem bore augmentations On a chief gules a cross argent, known as a "chief of the Order of Saint John of Jerusalem".

In Scotland the most frequent augmentation is the double tressure flory counter-flory, the most recognizable part of the Scottish royal arms, for example as granted (in a somewhat ironic usage) by the English King Henry VIII to Thomas Howard, 2nd Duke of Norfolk (an Englishman) after his victory over the Scots at the Battle of Flodden. A more bona fide one was granted by King Charles II (King of England and Scotland) to William Drummond, 1st Viscount Strathallan (c.1617–1688), a Scots nobleman and Royalist during the Civil War. Other forms of Scottish augmentations were granted, for example, to Sir Alexander Campbell, 1st Baronet who received an augmentation "a chief argent charged with a rock proper subscribed Gibraltar, between two medals for Seringapatam and Talavera" commemorating his part in the Great Siege of Gibraltar.

Examples

Emperor Charles V, who was also King of Spain, granted to Juan Sebastián Elcano, the surviving commander of the Ferdinand Magellan expedition that first circumnavigated the world, an augmentation of arms consisting of a world globe with the words Primus circumdedisti me (Latin: "You first encircled me"). Charles V's grandmother Isabella I of Castille added a pomegranate to her coat of arms in honor of the capture of Granada.

References

External links

Heraldry